Many BBC radio comedy programmes have been successful enough for the writers and performers to adapt them into television programmes. Unless otherwise stated these programmes were originally broadcast on BBC Radio 4, and then broadcast on one of the BBC's TV channels. The following list gives some of the more notable ones.

Television to radio transfers
Some television series transfer in the other direction.  Both the science fiction series Doctor Who and Blake's 7 have become short-lived radio series.  Several comedies, such as To the Manor Born (in 1997) and One Foot in the Grave, have also been transferred.

As another example, in 2004 the Andy Hamilton comedy Trevor's World of Sport transferred to Radio 4. Having largely failed in its television incarnation, it was felt the older medium might suit it better. This would seem to create the impression that, whereas popular radio shows are "promoted" to television, an unpopular television show was being "demoted" to radio. However, public opinion on the radio series has been mostly positive, suggesting that it was a good decision.

Radio programmes transferred to independent television
 A few early game shows from Radio Luxembourg transferred to ITV, when it started broadcasting in 1955. This included Take Your Pick and Double Your Money.

See also
List of television series made into books

BBC Radio programmes adapted for television
BBC Radio programmes adapted for television
BBC Radio programmes adapted for television
Radio programmes adapted for television